Jeandel is a French surname. Notable people with the surname include:

Catherine Jeandel, French geochemical oceanographer
René Jeandel (1924–2018), French cross-country and Nordic combined skier
Walter Jeandel (1918–2012), French cross-country and Nordic combined skier, brother of René

French-language surnames